

This is a timeline of Cypriot history, comprising important legal and territorial changes and political events in Cyprus.  To read about the background to these events, see History of Cyprus. See also the list of presidents of Cyprus.

 Millennia: 1st BC1st2nd3rd

Epipaleolithic and Neolithic periods (up to circa 3,800 BCE)

36th century BCE

37th–26th centuries BCE

25th century BCE

23rd–17th centuries BCE

16th century BCE

15th century BCE

14th century BCE

13th century BCE

12th century BCE

11th century BCE 

 Centuries: 
10th BC9th BC8th BC7th BC6th BC5th BC4th BC3rd BC2nd BC1st BC

10th century BCE

9th century BCE

8th century BC

7th century BCE

6th century BCE

5th century BCE

4th century BCE

3rd century BCE

2nd century BCE

1st century BCE 

 Centuries: 1st2nd3rd4th5th6th7th8th9th10th

1st century

2nd century

3rd century

4th century

5th century

6th century

7th century

8th century

9th century

10th century 

 Centuries: 11th12th13th14th15th16th17th18th19th20th

11th century

12th century

13th century

14th century

15th century

16th century

17th century

18th century

19th century

20th century

21st century

See also
 Timeline of Nicosia history

References

 
Cypriot